George Whaley (born 1860 or 1861) was a unionist politician in Northern Ireland.

Whaley worked as a baker.  He was active in the Ulster Unionist Party, and was elected to the Senate of Northern Ireland in 1940, at the age of eighty, serving for five years.

References

1860s births
20th-century deaths
Year of death missing
Members of the Senate of Northern Ireland 1941–1945
Ulster Unionist Party members of the Senate of Northern Ireland